Bondla Wildlife Sanctuary is located in northeastern Goa, India in Ponda taluka. The total area of the park is 8 km2. It is a popular destination for both tourists and schoolchildren. A wide variety of animal life can be encountered, including: sambar deer, Indian bison, Malabar giant squirrel, Indian peafowl and many species of snakes.

Bondla provides sanctuary to leopards who have been injured in human-wildlife conflict, as well as "dancing" bears and cobras who, along with their trainers, need a new life after this treatment of endangered wildlife. Bondla zoo is known for its successful breeding of gaur. As it is the only zoo in Goa, many visit the zoo. The zoo provides an excellent environment to breed and do researches on animals

Animals
 Indian boar
 Mugger crocodile
 Rose-ringed parakeet
 Alexandrine parakeet
 Plum-headed parakeet
 Silver pheasant
 Indian cobra
 Russell's viper
 Bengal tiger
 Indian Gaur
 Wild boar
 Sambar deer 
 Spotted deer
 Blackbuck
 Hippopotamus
 Rhesus macaque
 Jungle cat
 Spitting cobra

See also

References

External links

 Bondla Wildlife Sanctuary on goatourism.gov.in

Wildlife sanctuaries in Goa
Geography of North Goa district
Tourist attractions in North Goa district
Protected areas with year of establishment missing